was a Japanese copywriter. A 1971 graduate of Keio University, he formerly worked for Hakuhodo, Japan's second largest advertising agency. He died on June 22, 2009 of a myocardial infarction. He was 60 years old.

References

External links

Japanese copywriters
1948 births
2009 deaths